

David Carroll (July 30, 1950 – March 11, 1992), sometimes billed as David James Carroll, was an American actor whose last, and best remembered, role was that of Baron Felix von Gaigern in Grand Hotel: The Musical.

Carroll was born in Rockville Centre, New York, grew up in Greenwich, Connecticut, and graduated from Dartmouth College, where he was an active member of the Dartmouth Players. While at Dartmouth Carroll had star roles in several college musicals and in community theater.

He was nominated for two Tony Awards as Best Actor in a Musical: in 1988 for Chess and again in 1990 for Grand Hotel. Carroll also received three Drama Desk Awards nominations as an Outstanding Actor in a Musical: La bohème (1984) he costarred with Linda Ronstadt, Chess (1988), and Grand Hotel (1990).  The Original Broadway Cast recording of Chess received a 1988 Grammy Award nomination for Best Musical Cast Show album.  On the big screen, he had a brief scene with John Ritter in the movie Hero at Large.

Suffering from AIDS, he died of a pulmonary embolism in the restroom of the New York City BMG/RCA studio while attempting to record the cast album for Grand Hotel.  The album had been delayed for years because of rights issues and legal disputes over the score.  For the cast recording Brent Barrett ultimately performed the role of the Baron, but Carroll was featured on a bonus track: singing the Baron's solo number "Love Can't Happen", recorded during his cabaret performance at Steve McGraw's on 14 February 1991 with Wally Harper at the piano.

His long-time partner, Robert W. Homma, died on April 18, 2006.

Broadway 
 Where's Charley?  (1974) (understudy)
 Rodgers & Hart (1975)
 Oh, Brother! (1981)
 Seven Brides for Seven Brothers (1982) - Adam
 Wind in the Willows (1985) - Rat
 Chess (1988) - Anatoly
 Cafe Crown (1989)
 Grand Hotel (1989) - Baron Felix von Gaigern

Off-Broadway 
 Joseph and the Amazing Technicolor Dreamcoat 1976 (originated the title role at the Brooklyn Academy of Music)
 La bohème 1984 (at The Joseph Papp Public Theater)

Filmography

References

External links
 
 
 
 David Carroll at remembered.com
 David Carroll at muchloved.com

American male musical theatre actors
American male stage actors
American male television actors
American male film actors
20th-century American male actors
1950 births
1992 deaths
Dartmouth College alumni
Deaths from pulmonary embolism
AIDS-related deaths in New York (state)
People from Rockville Centre, New York
People from Greenwich, Connecticut
20th-century American singers
20th-century American male singers
American LGBT singers
American gay musicians
American gay actors
LGBT people from New York (state)
20th-century American LGBT people